Egmond aan den Hoef is a village in the Dutch province of North Holland. Until 2001, Egmond aan den Hoef was part of the municipality of Egmond.

The village was first mentioned in 1167 Ekmunde, and means "parcel of land belonging to Egmond". The name originally applied only to the castle, but was later used for the settlement around the castle.

In Egmond aan den Hoef are the remains of Egmond Castle, the residence of the House of Egmond. The castle was first built in the 11th century, and was destroyed around 1205. It was rebuilt and fortified, and was destroyed again in the 14th century. Again it was rebuilt. In 1573 at the order of William the Silent it was demolished by the Geuzen, led by Diederik Sonoy. The remnants were taken down at the end of the 18th century. During the 1930s the remains were dug up.

The French philosopher René Descartes, author of Meditations on First Philosophy, lived in Egmond aan den Hoef, right near the castle remains, in 1643-44 and perhaps longer. For many years he lived in the neighboring village of Egmond-Binnen.

Famous inhabitants
 William II, Lord of Egmond (ca.1230-1304)
 John I, Lord of Egmond] (1310 - 1369)
 Arnold I, Lord of Egmond (1337 - 1409)
 John II, Lord of Egmond] (1384 - 1451)
 William IV, Lord of Egmont (1412 - 1483)
 John III of Egmont, first Count of Egmond (1438 - 1516)
 John IV of Egmont, 2nd Count of Egmond (1499 - 1528)
 Isaac le Maire (1558-1624), founder of the Dutch East India Company
 René Descartes (1596-1650)
 Nicolaes Witsen (1641-1717), mayor of Amsterdam
 Erwin Bowien (1899-1972), German Painter.
 Teun de Nooijer (born there in 1976), hockey player

Gallery

References

External links

Populated places in North Holland
Bergen, North Holland